AP-3 complex subunit sigma-1 is a protein that in humans is encoded by the AP3S1 gene.

References

External links

Further reading